Zella Day Kerr (born March 13, 1995) is an American singer, songwriter, and musician from Pinetop-Lakeside, Arizona.

Day began recording music in her early teens, independently releasing her debut album, Powered by Love, in 2009. Following its success, Day worked as a songwriter for BMG Publishing Group and eventually landed a Hollywood Records artist deal. In 2015, Day released her major label debut,  Kicker, which was preceded by singles "Hypnotic" and "East of Eden". Day followed the release with promotional appearances for publications including Vogue, Playboy, and The Huffington Post, and on televised programs including Late Night with Seth Meyers and Conan. In 2016, Day performed at the Coachella Valley Music and Arts Festival.

Early life
Raised in Arizona, Day was immersed in the café and art space her parents helped to create in their small mountain town of Pinetop-Lakeside. She was first encouraged by her mother to learn guitar as practical means for achieving a sustainable career as a musician. Her first songs, written soon after picking up the guitar at age 9, took influence from the classic singer-songwriter records of her parents and the mystique of the rugged desert landscape around her.

Career

2009–2012: Powered by Love and Cynics vs. Dreamers
In 2009, Day self-released her debut album Powered by Love. The album was funded and recorded by a family friend. The initial success of Powered by Love brought the attention of BMG Publishing, who connected her with John Paul White of the Civil Wars and Meghan Trainor for writing sessions.

In 2012, Day self-released her first extended play, Cynics vs Dreamers. The album was produced by Wally Gagel and Xandy Barry of Wax Ltd. "Simple Song" was featured in the film Tooth Fairy 2.

That year she also released a cover of The White Stripes' "Seven Nation Army", which reached number one on Hype Machine's charts. The song received over 50 million plays on Spotify. In 2013, Day was featured on Sultan & Ned Shepard's "All These Roads" alongside Sam Martin. The single, which debuted in early October 2014 on Pete Tong's BBC Radio 1 broadcast, was celebrated by Billboard for its "ebbs and flows with harmonies and rhythmic shifts."

2013–2015: Major label debut with Kicker

In April 2014, "Sweet Ophelia" was released as the first single off of the Zella Day EP with the b-side "1965". The music video was directed by Gianennio Salucci and released on April 7, a day ahead of the 7" release by tastemaker B3Sci Records in coordination with Day's Pinetop Records, an imprint of Hollywood Records.

The Zella Day EP was released on September 23, 2014. It was celebrated as an "intangible tapestry of sound and raw emotion, blanketing the pop, alternative, and folk genres" by Atwood magazine. The EP peaked at No. 16 on the Billboard Heatseekers Chart and garnered critical acclaim. The final track on the EP, "Hypnotic", was picked as an iTunes Single of the Week and was later released as the second single from the album. In December 2014, Day was featured as a guest vocalist on the acoustic version of Borns' "Electric Love" off his debut EP, Candy.

On February 27, 2015 Day announced her second studio album, Kicker. The video was directed by Gianennio Salucci and now boasts over 8 million views on Vevo. In May 2015, Day debuted the single "High", and performed it live the following month on Conan as her television debut.

Kicker was released on June 2, 2015 via Pinetop Records and Hollywood Records. The album title references the old Arizona mining town where Day's parents married while exploring toxic relationships, breakups, broken homes, love and lust. Speaking about the album, she explained, "The music's spiritual resonance is clearly influenced by the Northern Arizona mountains that sheltered my creative energy from any outside implications of city mentality." The record was hailed as Day's most intimate yet gorgeously expansive album yet and charted at number 65 on the US Billboard 200 and number 7 on the US Top Alternative. Interview Magazine praised Day's uniquely "own charmed style", and BlackBook Magazine declared, "it's safe to say this girl's on her way to being a household name."

On December 17, 2015 Day performed on Last Call with Carson Daly. On January 4, 2016 she performed "Hypnotic" on Late Night with Seth Meyers. Her third national TV appearance was followed by a number of high-profile festival performances at Billboard Hot 100 Fest, Music Midtown, and the iHeart Radio Music Festival. Her debut at Coachella in 2016 caught the attention of Los Angeles Magazine, which described the performance as "hypnotic"; Billboard, which hailed her set as "stellar"; and Consequence of Sound, which exclaimed, "it's entirely possible that Zella Day looks back on Coachella 2016 as the moment that launched her career in the earnest... Day is an undeniably powerful vocalist."

2016–2018: Departure from Hollywood Records

On May 4, 2016 Day was featured again as a musical guest on Last Call with Carson Daly, debuting her newest single, "Mustang Kids", live. As the latest single ahead of a headlining tour in June, "Mustang Kids" was officially released on June 9, 2016 featuring a guest verse from Florida-bred rapper Baby E. and a music video directed by Tim Mattia. Following the North American headlining tour in June 2016, Day embarked on a supporting run with L.A. neo-soul outfit Fitz and the Tantrums throughout July and then another supporting slot with Michael Franti and Spearhead in August.

In October 2016, Day released the single "Man on the Moon" and announced a 7" release via B3Sci. November 2016 saw the digital premier of "Hunnie Pie" as a B-side to the "Man on the Moon" 7". On November 29, 2018, Day uploaded a letter to her social media accounts explaining she had been released from her label and production deal. On December 14, she uploaded a video announcement alongside a new song titled "I Don't Know How To End" to her website. Day appeared as a guest on Lana Del Rey's LA to the Moon Tour in 2018.

2019–present: Where Does the Devil Hide and Sunday in Heaven 
Day performed a cover of "For Free" alongside Weyes Blood with Lana Del Rey for her The Norman Fucking Rockwell! Tour show at The Hollywood Bowl on October 10, 2019. The trio later performed the song at the Grammy Museum in Los Angeles.

On October 25, she released a cover of "You Sexy Thing". After signing a deal with Easy Eye Sound and Concord Records, Day released the singles "People Are Strangers" in April and "My Game" in May, alongside accompanying music videos. On April 27, she announced an EP titled Where Does the Devil Hide. The announcement was followed by the releases of "Purple Haze" and "Only a Dream" in July.

On October 14, 2022, she released her third album, Sunday in Heaven.

Discography

Powered by Love (2009)
Kicker (2015)
Sunday in Heaven (2022)

Tours
Headlining
 Zella Day on Tour (2015)

Supporting
 Fitz and the Tantrums – N/A (2016)

Guest
 Michael Franti & Spearhead – Soulrocker Tour (2016)
 Seekae – Future Classic Tour (2017)
 Lana Del Rey – LA to the Moon Tour (2018)
 Lana Del Rey – The Norman Fucking Rockwell! Tour (2019)
 Silversun Pickups (2021)

Filmography

Web

Music video

References

External links

1995 births
Living people
21st-century American women singers
American women pop singers
American women rock singers
American indie pop musicians
American women singer-songwriters
Hollywood Records artists
People from Navajo County, Arizona
21st-century American singers
Singer-songwriters from Arizona